Italian Studies is a 2021 American drama film, written and directed by Adam Leon. It stars Vanessa Kirby, David Ajala, Simon Brickner, Annika Wahlsten, Annabel Hoffman, and Maya Hawke.

It had its world premiere at the Tribeca Film Festival on June 12, 2021. It was released on January 14, 2022, by Magnolia Pictures in theaters and VOD.

Plot
A writer loses her memory in New York City, and attempting to find her way home, she connects with a group of strangers in conversations, real and imagined.

Cast
 Vanessa Kirby as Alina Reynolds
 Simon Brickner as Simon
 Annika Wahlsten as Annika
 Annabel Hoffman as Annabel
 David Ajala as Ade
 Maya Hawke as Erin
 Fred Hechinger as Matt

Production
In March 2019, it was announced Vanessa Kirby had joined the cast of the film, with Adam Leon directing from a screenplay he wrote.

Release
It had its world premiere at the Tribeca Film Festival on June 12, 2021. In October 2021, Magnolia Pictures acquired the distribution rights to the film. The film was released in theaters on January 14, 2022.

Reception

Box office
In the U.S. and Canada, the film earned $3,401 from seven theaters in its opening weekend and $579 in its second.

Critical response
Italian Studies holds a 43% approval rating on review aggregator website Rotten Tomatoes, based on 23 reviews, with a weighted average of 5.60/10.

In a positive review, Rolling Stone called the film, "Unforgettable from the jump," features a "raw, guileless, egoless performance" from Vanessa Kirby, and that it "may be the most immersive memory loss movie of all time." The Los Angeles Times wrote, "Italian Studies is a unique curio of a film, a free sketch of time and place melting into a singular subjective experience that asks, “Does memory matter?”  In a mixed review, Variety wrote that "Adam Leon’s minor-key, jaggedly structured indie isn’t concerned with the specific whens, hows and whys of Alina’s out-of-nowhere amnesia, but with the hazy in-the-moment sensation of being struck with it, the sensation of stumbling for the lightswitch in your own mind. That’s a nebulous-sounding dramatic proposition, though as performed by a nervy, live-wire Vanessa Kirby, it becomes a tensely compelling one."

References

External links
 
 

2021 films
2021 drama films
2020s American films
2020s English-language films
American drama films
Films about amnesia
Films about writers
Films scored by Nicholas Britell
Films set in London
Films set in New York City
Films shot in New York City
Topic Studios films